Lupinus lapidicola is a rare species of lupine known by the common name Mt. Eddy lupine. It is endemic to California, where it is known from only a few locations in the northernmost mountain ranges, including Mount Eddy in the Klamath Mountains. The herbage is coated in silvery silky hairs. The inflorescence is a small bundle of flower whorls, each flower about a centimeter long and purple in color with a yellowish patch on its banner.

References

External links
Jepson Manual Treatment
Photo gallery

lapidicola
Endemic flora of California
Plants described in 1924
Flora without expected TNC conservation status